This is a list of airports in Guinea, sorted by location.



List

See also 
 Transport in Guinea
 List of airports by ICAO code: G#GU - Guinea
 Wikipedia: WikiProject Aviation/Airline destination lists: Africa#Guinea

References

External links 
 Lists of airports in Guinea:
 Great Circle Mapper
 Aircraft Charter World
 World Aero Data

Guinea
 
Airports
Airports
Guinea